Seasons is a 2015 French-German nature documentary film directed, produced, co-written, and narrated by Jacques Perrin, with Jacques Cluzaud as co-director.
In Japanese, the film was narrated by Fumino Kimura and Shōfukutei Tsurube II.

References

External links
 Official website
 

2015 films
2015 documentary films
Pathé films
Documentary films about animals
Documentary films about nature
2010s French-language films
French documentary films
French independent films
German documentary films
Films about animals
Films scored by Bruno Coulais
2010s French films
2010s German films
Films directed by Jacques Perrin
Films produced by Jacques Perrin
French-language German films